"Wonderful Baby" is a song written and originally recorded by Don McLean. It is a track on his album, Homeless Brother, and a tribute to Fred Astaire. The single peaked at number ninety-three on the Billboard Hot 100 and became McLean's second and last number one on the Easy Listening chart.  "Wonderful Baby" also reached number one on the Canadian Adult Contemporary chart.

Record World said that "Portraying heaven as a place where soaring cherubs count their digits, McLean performs a top 40 lullabye which should fly higher than any since 'Vincent.'"

Chart performance

Cover versions
Fred Astaire covered the song on his 1975 album Attitude Dancing

See also
List of number-one adult contemporary singles of 1975 (U.S.)

References

External links
 

1975 songs
1975 singles
Don McLean songs
Songs written by Don McLean
United Artists Records singles
Songs about children
Songs about fathers